Nicrophorus vespilloides is a burying beetle described by Johann Friedrich Wilhelm Herbst in 1783.

The beetles are 10 – 18 mm long. They have two conspicuous orange-yellow bands on the elytra.  The color of the antennae are an important distinguishing feature, being totally black.

This is one of the most well studied of the burying beetles with over 1,000 citations found via Google Scholar. What had been considered Nicrophorus vespilloides in mid and eastern Canada and northeastern USA was determined by Sikes et al. in 2016 to be a separate, overlooked sister species of Nicrophorus vespilloides that had been named by Kirby in 1837.

This sister species, Nicrophorus hebes Kirby, is restricted to Sphagnum bogs and marshes,. Nicrophorus vespilloides occurs throughout the northern Palearctic, Alaska and northwestern Canada where it is found in open forest habitats. The restriction of its sister species N. hebes to bogs in North America has been attributed to competition with its closely related congener, N. defodiens which in this area is found in forest habitats. N. hebes reproduces exclusively in bogs in North America and is never found in adjacent (<) forested habitat in the Mer Bleue bog area near Ottawa, Ontario, Canada.

There are also a number of phoretic (hitch-hiking) mites that are associated with N. vespilloides. These include Pelzneria nr. crenulata, Macrocheles merderius, and Uroobovella nr. novasimilis and the largest mite Poecilochirus carabi. P. carabi is not attached by any physical means (such as a secreted anal stalk in the case of M. merderius) to N. vespilloides. When the males or females of N. vespilloides have finished breeding on a carcass the deutonymphs of P. carabi roam freely about the body of the beetles as they search for new carcasses to reproduce. It had been proposed that P. carabi deutonymphs, on arrival at a new carcass dismounted from the beetles and consumed fly eggs and larvae which would have competed for the beetle larvae for food. This relationship which benefited the beetles has been described as mutualistic. However, it has been shown that adults of P. carabi consume the eggs of N. vespilloides and that this has direct and negative effects on the reproduction of this beetle species.

N. vespilloides is also used as a model organism in the study of social immunity.

References

Silphidae
Beetles of North America
Beetles of Europe
Beetles of Asia
Beetles described in 1783
Taxa named by Johann Friedrich Wilhelm Herbst